Three Faces East is a 1930 American Pre-Code film directed by Roy Del Ruth and starring Constance Bennett and Erich von Stroheim. Produced by Daryl Zanuck and released by Warner Brothers it is based on a 1918 Broadway play about World War I spies, Three Faces East, by Anthony Paul Kelly. It was filmed as a silent in 1926. A later remake in 1940 starred Boris Karloff and Margaret Lindsay was titled British Intelligence.

Plot
During World War I, a soldier named Valdar (Erich von Stroheim) receives a medal for bravery from the King of Belgium. Elsewhere, behind German lines, a captured British nurse (Constance Bennett) is revealed to be a German spy. She is given an assignment to infiltrate the household of Sir Winston Chamberlain, the British First Lord of the Admiralty (William Holden—no relation to the younger American film star), and steal secrets for her superior, a German spy named Blecher. Under the name Frances Hawtree, the agent, using the code term "three faces east," discovers that Valdar, who has used his award to place himself as Chamberlain's head butler, is actually her contact, a German spy named Schiller. Both Hawtree and Valdar come under suspicion from Chamberlain's associates, and both Valdar and Chamberlain's son fall in love with her. Eventually, it is revealed that Hawtree is actually a British double-agent working to find and expose the master spy Blecher, the true identity of Schiller/Valdar. When Blecher attempts to send secret information to his superiors, Hawtree shoots him. As the film ends, she is sent to Sweden on a new intelligence mission.

Cast
 Constance Bennett as Frances Hawtree/Z-1
 Erich von Stroheim as Valdar/Schiller Blecher
 Anthony Bushell as Captain Arthur Chamberlain
 William Holden as Sir Winston Chamberlain
 William Courtenay as Mr. Yates
 Crauford Kent as General Hewlett
 Charlotte Walker as  Catherine, Lady Chamberlain
 Ullrich Haupt as Colonel
 Paul Panzer as "Kirsch" the Decoy
 Wilhelm von Brincken as Captain Kugler

Preservation
The film survived complete. It was transferred into a 16mm film by Associated Artists Productions in 1956-1958 and shown on television. A 16mm copy is housed at the Wisconsin Center for Film & Theater Research. Another print exists at the Library of Congress.

References

External links
 
 
 
 

1930 films
1930s spy drama films
American spy drama films
American black-and-white films
American films based on plays
Films directed by Roy Del Ruth
Films produced by Darryl F. Zanuck
Films set in England
World War I spy films
1930 drama films
1930s English-language films
1930s American films